Chuar rebellion, also known as Jungle Mahal movement was a series of peasant movements between 1766 to 1816 by the tribal inhabitants of the countryside surrounding the Jungle Mahals settlements of Midnapore, Bankura and Manbhum against the rule of the East India Company (EIC). This was the first revolt against the East India Company (EIC) in Chotanagpur areas of Bengal Presidency (now West Bengal and Jharkhand).

Bhumij rebellion led by Ganga Narayan Singh against the British East India Company in 1832-33, is also considered as one of the series of Chuar rebellion. The British had called it as 'Ganga Narain's Hungama', while many historians had written it as Chuar rebellion.

Chuar people 
The literal meaning of Chuar or Chuad or Chuhad is a barbaric, an uncultured or a robber. During the British rule, primarily the Bhumijas of the Jungle Mahal area were called chuars, their main occupation was hunting of animals and birds and farming in the forests, but later some Bhumij became zamindars and some started working as Ghatwals and Paiks (soldiers). When the East India Company started collecting revenue for the first time in 1765 AD in the Jangal Mahal district of Bengal, then in this conspiratorial way of the British, the water, forest, land grab activities were first opposed by the people of Bhumij tribe and the revolution was blown against the British rulers in 1766 AD. When the Britishers asked who these people were, their stoic landlords addressed them as Chuar out of hatred and contempt, after which the name of that rebellion was 'Chuar Rebellion'.

Rebellion 
When the East India Company first began collecting revenue in the Jangal Mahal district of Bengal in 1765, the Chuars revolted against them. Various ethnic groups, viz. Bagdi, Kurmi, Bauri, Bhumij and other communities could not tolerate the British policy of resumption of land which they enjoyed since the Mughal period, joined the chuars. In 1766, this tribal revolt started in Dhalbhum, Manbhum, Midnapore and Bankura districts of Jungle Mahal. Jagannath Singh, zamindar of Ghatsila, led the rebellion with his five thousands of followers at Dhalbhum in 1766-71. Raghunath Mahato led the revolt in 1769 and was killed by the British in 1778. Again in 1771, Subal Singh of Kuilapal, Shyam Gunjam Singh of Dhadka and Dubraj Singh revolted against the British. The Chuar people intensified this rebellion in the surrounding areas of Manbhum, Raipur and Panchet. It was later led by Jagannath Singh's son Baidyanath Singh and grandson Raghunath Singh. In 1782-84, Mangal Singh along with his allies also led this rebellion. The Chuar Rebellion was at its peak in 1798–99 under the leadership of Durjan Singh, Lal Singh and Mohan Singh, but was crushed by the British Company's forces.

In early 1799, the Chuars were organized at three places around Midnapore: Bahadurpur, Salboni and Karnagarh. From here they launched guerrilla attacks. Among these was the residence of Rani Shiromani in Karnagarh, who actively led them. According to the letter written by the then collector, the Chuar rebellion continued to grow and by February 1799, they had occupied a continuous wide area of many villages around Midnapore. In March, Rani attacked with about 300 rebels and looted all the weapons of the Company's soldiers in the garh (local fort) of Karangarh. In July 1799, Ghatwal Gobardhan Dikpati burnt two villages of Shilda and revolted in Kshirpai and Anantpur with his 400 rebels. This sequence of attacks and plunder continued till December 1799. Later, other zamindars, along with the Ghatwals and Paiks, spread this revolt to the entire Jungle Mahal and the surrounding areas, which lasted till 1816. Even after this, the rebellion continued in some areas of Bengal in a sporadic form.

Ganga Narayan Singh led a revolt against the British in 1832-33, called Bhumij rebellion. The British also called it as 'Ganga Narain's Hungama' while many historians had written it as Chuar rebellion.

Leaders 
Bhumij zamindars Jagannath Singh of Dhalbhum, Rani Shiromani of Karnagarh, Durjan Singh of Raipur, Baidyanath Singh of Dhalbhum, Raghunath Singh of Dhalbhum, Subal Singh of Kuilapal, Shyam Ganjam Singh of Dhadka, Raja Madhu Singh of Manbhum, Raja Mohan Singh of Juriah, Mangal Singh of Panchet, Lakshman Singh of Dulma, Dubraj Singh of Birbhum, Lal Singh, Sunder Narayan Singh, Fateh Singh and Bagri leaders Achal Singh and Gobardhan Dikpati and Mahato leader Raghunath Mahato and other Rajas of Midnapore and Jungle Mahals led this peasant rebellion at different periods during 1766 — 1833.

The Chuar Mutiny, led by Durjan Singh, was at its height in 1798-99, but was crushed by the Company's army.

See also 
 Bhumij rebellion
 History of Bengal
 History of Jharkhand

References

Further reading 
  
 
 

Bengal Presidency
Rebellions in India
History of Jharkhand
Rebellions by ethnic group
Bhumij
18th century in British India